Minoru is a masculine Japanese given name.

Minoru may also refer to:

Places
Minoru Park, park located in Richmond, British Columbia
Minoru Chapel, Richmond, British Columbia

Products
Minoru 3D Webcam

Other
Minoru (horse), King Edward VII's horse that won the 1909 Epsom Derby